Teyego is one of the five parishes in the municipality of Ribera de Arriba, in the principality of Asturias in northern Spain.

Tellego is located two kilometers from Soto de Ribera.  It has an area of 5.78 square kilometers, and a population of 44 inhabitants.  Its notable buildings include the 17th-Century Church of St. Nicholas of Bari.

Neighborhoods 
 Entepuentes
 Les Mianes
 La Mortera
 Sardín
 Teyego
 Vegalencia

References 

Parishes of Ribera de Arriba